Ahmad Syaikhu (born 23 January 1965) is an Indonesian politician who is currently President of the Prosperous Justice Party. He served as the vice mayor of Bekasi between 2013 and 2018 as the deputy of Rahmat Effendi.

Born in Cirebon Regency, he studied accounting and worked as a government auditor before being elected into Bekasi's city council and later the West Java Provincial Council. He ran as Mayor of Bekasi and Vice Governor of West Java in 2008 and 2018, respectively, but both bids failed.

Background
Syaikhu was born in Ciledugkulon village, Ciledug, Cirebon Regency on 23 January 1965. His father was a civil servant. Syaikhu completed his basic education there, moving to a separate school once during elementary due to his father's reassignment, before proceeding to study accounting.

Career
He began his career in 1986 as a government auditor in South Sumatra. After three years there, he moved to become an auditor for the central government.

Legislatures
In the 2004 legislative election, Syaikhu won a seat in Bekasi's city council for the 2004–2009 term. Midway, he ran in the 2008 Bekasi mayoral election, but lost to Mochtar Mohammad and his running mate Rahmat Effendi. He then won a seat in the West Java Provincial Council following the 2009 legislative election.

Bekasi
He once more participated in the 2013 mayoral election as the running mate to Rahmat, with the pair winning with 43 percent of votes in the five-candidate race. They were sworn in on 13 March 2013. In 2015, he was elected as the chairman for the Prosperous Justice Party's West Java branch.

Syaikhu ran as the running mate to Sudrajat in the 2018 gubernatorial election for West Java. Although they  initially placed low in opinion polls (around 4 percent), the pair exceeded expectations and placed second behind Ridwan Kamil/Uu Ruzhanul Ulum, winning 28.74 percent.

Following the end of his tenure in Bekasi, he registered to run under PKS as a candidate for the People's Representative Council. Later, he was brought forward as a candidate to replace Sandiaga Uno as the Vice Governor of Jakarta. He was later elected president of the Prosperous Justice Party for the 2020–2025 tenure.

Personal life
He is married to Lilik Wakhidah and the couple has six children.

Syaikhu founded several organizations focusing on Islamic education. In addition, he is an avid shooter, having served as chairman of Bekasi's shooting and hunting association.

References

1965 births
Living people
People from Cirebon
West Java Regional People's Representative Council members
Members of Bekasi city council
Prosperous Justice Party politicians